

215001–215100 

|-id=016
| 215016 Catherinegriffin ||  || Catherine Grennan (née Griffin, 1939–2004) was the mother of the discoverer. || 
|-id=021
| 215021 Fanjingshan ||  || Fanjingshan, located in Tongren City of Guizhou Province (south-west China), was added to the World Heritage List by UNESCO at the 42nd World Heritage Conference in 2018. The rare wildlife and native forest ecosystem are well protected in the region of Fanjingshan National Nature Reserve. || 
|-id=023
| 215023 Huangjiqing ||  || Huang Jiqing (1904–1995) was a Chinese geologist and member of the Chinese Academy of Geological Sciences who is considered a founder of modern geology in China. || 
|-id=044
| 215044 Joãoalves ||  || Joõ Alves (born 1968) was the director of Calar Alto Observatory from 2006 to 2010 and is now professor of stellar astrophysics at the University of Vienna. || 
|-id=080
| 215080 Kaohsiung ||  || Kaohsiung, Taiwan's second-largest city. || 
|-id=089
| 215089 Hermanfrid || 2709 P-L || Hermanfrid Schubart, German expert in prehistoric archaeology. || 
|}

215101–215200 

|-bgcolor=#f2f2f2
| colspan=4 align=center | 
|}

215201–215300 

|-bgcolor=#f2f2f2
| colspan=4 align=center | 
|}

215301–215400 

|-bgcolor=#f2f2f2
| colspan=4 align=center | 
|}

215401–215500 

|-id=423
| 215423 Winnecke ||  || Friedrich August Theodor Winnecke (1835–1897), astronomer at Berlin, Pulkovo and Strasbourg. || 
|-id=463
| 215463 Jobse ||  || Klaas Jobse, Dutch gardener and amateur astronomer who operates the Cyclops Observatory in Oostkapelle and a fireball all-sky camera. || 
|}

215501–215600 

|-id=592
| 215592 Normarose ||  || Norma Rose (1929–2001) was the mother of two surviving children, Cheryll and Jim Riffle, the latter being the first discoverer of this minor planet. || 
|}

215601–215700 

|-bgcolor=#f2f2f2
| colspan=4 align=center | 
|}

215701–215800 

|-bgcolor=#f2f2f2
| colspan=4 align=center | 
|}

215801–215900 

|-id=809
| 215809 Hugoschwarz ||  || Hugo Schwarz (1953–2006), Dutch astronomer. || 
|-id=841
| 215841 Čimelice ||  || Cimelice, a south Bohemian village on the route from Písek to Prague. || 
|-id=868
| 215868 Rohrer ||  || Heinrich Rohrer (1933–2013), Swiss physicist and Nobel laureate || 
|-id=886
| 215886 Barryarnold || 2005 FP || Barry Arnold (born 1945), a friend of French discoverer Bernard Christophe || 
|}

215901–216000 

|-bgcolor=#f2f2f2
| colspan=4 align=center | 
|}

References 

215001-216000